Banno (written: ,  or ) is a Japanese surname. Notable people with the surname include:

, Japanese swimmer
, Japanese astronomer
, Japanese film director
, Japanese politician

See also
3394 Banno, a main-belt asteroid

Japanese-language surnames